This is a list of Japanese idols; a type of celebrity in Japan. The following list includes both female and male idols as well as both solo idols and idol groups.

Others 
 =LOVE (group)
 ≠Me (group)
 °C-ute (group)
 3776 (group)
 22/7 (group)
 3B Junior (group)
 9nine (group)
μ's (group)
 &TEAM (group)

A 
 Aa! (group)
 AAA (group)
 A.B.C-Z (group)
 AKB48 (group)
 Akishibu Project (group)
 Arcana Project (group)
 Ali Project (group)
 Angerme (group)
 Arashi (group)
 Athena & Robikerottsu (group)
 Ayumikurikamaki (group)
 Asami Abe
 Nagisa Abe
 Natsumi Abe
 Shizue Abe
 Yumi Adachi
 Shoko Aida
 Masaki Aiba
 Himika Akaneya
 Jin Akanishi
 Sayaka Akimoto
 Mari Amachi
 Jun Amaki
 Chihiro Anai
 Yuko Anai
 Sakura Andō
 Anza
 Hiroko Anzai
 Maria Anzai
 Yui Aragaki
 Momoka Ariyasu
 Miyoko Asada
 Nao Asahi
 Yui Asaka
 Nana Asakawa
 Aiko Asano
 Megumi Asaoka
 Mamiko Asō
 Aqours (group)
 Haruka Ayase
 Rion Azuma

B 
 B.I Shadow (group)
 BaBe (duo)
 Babyraids Japan (group)
 Bakusute Sotokanda Icchome (group)
 Band Ja Naimon! (group)
 Batten Showjo Tai (group)
 Ballistik Boyz (group)
 Beatcats (group)
 Be First (group)
 BeForU (group)
 Berryz Kobo (group)
 Beyooooonds (group)
 Bis (group)
 BiS Kaidan (group)
 Bish (group)
 Bon-Bon Blanco (group)
 Boys and Men (group)
 Bullet Train (group)
 bump.y (group)
 Buono! (group)
 Buzy (group)
 Bonnie Pink (post-idol)
 B.O.L.T (group)

C 
 Camellia Factory (group)
 Canary Club (group)
 Candies (group)
 Checkicco (group)
 Cheeky Parade (group)
 Chinpara (group)
 Chocolove from AKB48 (group)
 Chō Tokimeki Sendenbu (group)
 Ciao Bella Cinquetti (group)
 ClariS (duo)
 Clear’s (group)
 CoCo (group)
 Cocoa Otoko (group)
 Coconuts Musume (group)
 College Cosmos (group)
 Country Musume (group)
 Cross Gene (group)
 Crown Pop (group)
 CY8ER (group)
 Cymbals (band) (group)
 Cynhn (group)
 Agnes Chan
 Naomi Chiaki
 Yuri Chinen
 Choucho

D 
 D&D (group)
 D-Date (group)
 Da Pump (group)
 Da-ice (group)
 Danceroid (group)
 Dancing Dolls (group)
 Def.Diva (group)
 Dempagumi.inc (group)
 Dialogue (group)
 DISH// (group)
 DIVA (group)
 Doll Elements (group)
 Dorothy Little Happy (group)
 Dream5 (group)
 Dream Morning Musume (group)
 Alisa Durbrow

E 
 Earth (group)
 Ebisu Muscats (group)
 Ecomoni (group)
 E-girls (group)
 Empire (group)
 Especia (group)
 Enako
 Kanako Enomoto
 ExWhyZ

F 
 Faky (group)
 Fantastics (group)
 First Place (group)
 Flame (group)
 Flap Girls' School (group)
 Folder5 (group)
 Four Leaves (group)
 French Kiss (group)
 Fudanjuku (group)
 Kyoko Fukada
 Kanon Fukuda
 Mizuki Fukumura
 Miki Fujimoto

G 
 Gackt (post-idol)
 GAM (duo)
 Gang Parade (group)
 Garnidelia (duo)
 GAM 
 Girls² (group)
 Go to the Beds (group)
 Golf & Mike (duo)
 Gomattō (group)
 Guardians 4 (group)
 Maki Goto

H 
 Hachimitsu Rocket (group)
 Halna (group)
 Hello Pro Kenshusei (group)
 Hello! Project Kids (group)
 Hey! Say! JUMP (group)
 High-King (group)
 Hikaru Genji (group)
 Hinatazaka46 (group)
 Hinoi Team (group)
 HKT48 (group)
 Ho6la (group)
 Hōkago Princess (group)
 Hotch Potchi (group)
 HR (group)
 Mai Hagiwara
 Chitose Hajime
 Chisaki Hama
 Ayumi Hamasaki
 Yu Hasebe
 Kanna Hashimoto
 Hatsune Miku
 Hiroko Hayashi
 Aya Hirano
 Kusano Hironori
 Ryōko Hirosue
 Mieko Hirota
 Kanata Hongo
 Yui Horie

I 
 INI (group)
 I Ris (group)
 Ice Creamusume (group)
 Idol College (group)
 Idol Renaissance (group)
 Idoling!!! (group)
 Iginari Tohoku San
 Sayaka Ichii
 Yuri Ichii
 Miori Ichikawa
 Kaori Iida
 Raura Iida
 Riho Iida
 Haruna Iikubo
 Rina Ikoma
 Akiko Ikuina
 Erika Ikuta
 Erina Ikuta
 Toma Ikuta
 Miyuki Imori
 Kei Inoo
 Mao Inoue
 Waka Inoue 
 Saaya Irie
 Anna Iriyama
 Ayumi Ishida (b. 1948)
 Ayumi Ishida (b. 1997)
 Haruka Ishida
 Aya Ishiguro
 Kaori Ishihara
 Yujiro Ishihara
 Rika Ishikawa
 Mako Ishino
 Yōko Ishino
 Sayaka Isoyama
 Tomomi Itano
 Maiko Itō
 Ran Ito
 Sakiko Ito
 Yuna Ito
 Yukiko Iwai
 Misaki Iwasa
 Hiromi Iwasaki
 Yoshimi Iwasaki
 Karen Iwata

J 
 J Soul Brothers (group)
 J-Friends (group)
 Janne Da Arc (group)
JO1 (group)
 Johnnys (group)
 Johnny's Jr (group)
 Johnny's West (group)
 Juice=Juice (group)

K 
 Kamen Joshi (group)
 Kamen Rider Girls (group)
 Kanjani Eight (group)
 Karen Girl's (group)
 KAT-TUN (group)
 Keyakizaka46 (group)
 King & Prince (group)
 Kids Alive (group)
 KinKi Kids (duo)
 Kira Pika (duo)
 Kis-my-ft2 (group)
 Kitty GYM (group)
 Reon Kadena 
 Kazuya Kamenashi
 Moe Kamikokuryo
 Miyuki Kanbe
 Sayaka Kanda
 Shigeaki Kato
 Yukie Kawamura
 Tomoko Kawase
 Umika Kawashima
 Aiko Kayo
 Naoko Ken
 Noriko Kijima
 You Kikkawa
 Moa Kikuchi
 Ayumi Kinoshita
 Midori Kinouchi
 Kumi Koda
 Kyōko Koizumi
 Ayaka Komatsu
 Miho Komatsu
 Keiichiro Koyama
 Haruka Kudō
 Chiaki Kuriyama
 Koharu Kusumi
 Minako Kotobuki

L 
 Lazy (group)
 Lead (group)
 Liella! (group)
 LinQ (group)
 Lip's (group)
 LiSA
 Little Glee Monster (group)
 LinQ (group)
 Lip's (group)
 LM.C (duo)
 Lovely Doll (group)
 Lyrical School (group)
 Ann Lewis

M 
 Magnolia Factory (group)
 Mameshiba no Taigun (group)
 MAX (group)
 Melon Kinenbi (group)
 Metamuse (group)
 MilkyWay (group)
 Mini-Moni (group)
 Momoiro Clover Z (group)
 Morning Musume (group)
 Morning Musume Otomegumi (group)
 Morning Musume Sakuragumi (group)
 Morning Musume Tanjō 10nen Kinentai (group)
 Musubizm (group)
 Musukko Club (group)
 Atsuko Maeda
 Yui Makino
 Erina Mano
 Ryuhei Maruyama
 Takahisa Masuda
 Seiko Matsuda
 Jurina Matsui
 Rena Matsui
 Yuya Matsushita
 Jun Matsumoto
 Aya Matsuura
 Megumi
 Sayumi Michishige
 Mihiro
 Saori Minami
 Ayaka Miyoshi
 Nana Mizuki
 Yui Mizuno
 Moga Mogami
 Kanako Momota
 Masako Mori
 Hiroko Moriguchi
 Chisato Moritaka
 Osamu Mukai
 Shingo Murakami
 Ayami Mutō
 Myco

N 
 N Zero (group)
 Naniwa Danshi (group)
 Negicco (group)
 NEWS (group)
 Neverland (group)
 NGT48 (group)
 Nice Girl Project! (group)
 NiziU (group)
 NMB48 (group)
 No Sleeves (group)
 Nochiura Natsumi (group)
 Nogizaka46 (group)
 Not Yet (group)
 Nyangilas (group)
 NYC (group)
 Shoko Nakagawa
 Yuto Nakajima
 Yukie Nakama
 Yuichi Nakamaru
 Akina Nakamori
 Suzuka Nakamoto
 Miho Nakayama
 Yuma Nakayama
 Jun Natsukawa
 Miyabi Natsuyaki
 Kazunari Ninomiya
 Hikaru Nishida
 Ryo Nishikido

O 
 Ocha Norma (group)
 Ongaku Gatas (group)
 Onyanko Club (group)
 Orbit (group)
 Osaka Performance Doll (group)
 Otome Shinto (group)
 Mina Ōba
 Chieko Ochi
 Megumi Odaka
 Haruna Ogata
 Makoto Ogawa
 Mana Ogawa
 Natsumi Ogawa
 Noriko Ogawa
 Yōko Oginome
 Yui Ogura
 Yuko Ogura 
 Kumiko Ohba
 Satoshi Ohno
 Takako Ohta
 Nana Okada (b. 1959)
 Nana Okada (b. 1997)
 Yukiko Okada
 Junichi Okada
 Chisato Okai
 Keito Okamoto
 Ai Okawa
 Chiyo Okumura
 Makoto Okunaka
 Tadayoshi Okura
 Reiko Ōmori
 Ayano Ōmoto
 Judy Ongg
 Yuka Onishi
 Erena Ono
 Mikiyo Ōno
 Itsumi Osawa
 Mai Oshima
 Ryoka Oshima
 Yuko Oshima
 Aika Ota
 Hiromi Ōta
 Takako Ōta
 Shinobu Otake
 Ai Otsuka
 Nana Owada
 Shizuka Ōya

P 
 Paradises (group)
 Party Rockets GT (group)
 Passcode (group)
 Passpo (group)
 Perfume (group)
 Petitmoni (group)
 Piggs (group)
 Pink Babies (group)
 Pink Lady (duo)
 PureBoys (group)
 Predia (group)
 PrizmaX (group)
 Prizmmy (group)

R 
 Rag Fair (group)
 Rainych
 Rakutenshi (group)
 The Rampage (group)
 Rev. from DVL (group)
 Ribbon (group)
 Rinrin & Ranran (duo)
 Rihwa
 Rock A Japonica (group)
 Romans (group)
 Run&Gun (group)

S 
 Sakurazaka46 (group)
 Sakura Gakuin (group)
 SDN48 (group)
 Sexy Zone (group)
 Ships (duo)
 Shiritsu Ebisu Chugaku (group)
 Shonentai (group)
 Shuchishin (group)
 Shugo Chara Egg! (group)
 Shūji to Akira (duo)
 SixTones (group)
 SKE48 (group)
 Snow Man (group)
 SPEED (group)
 Sphere (group)
 Starmarie (group)
 STU48 (group)
 Suitei Shoujo (duo)
 Sunmyu (group)
 Super Girls (group)
 Super Monkey's (group)
 SweetS (group)
 Noriko Sakai
 Ikue Sakakibara
 Maaya Sakamoto
 Junko Sakurada
 Sho Sakurai
 Ayaka Sasaki
 Rino Sashihara
 Masaki Sato
 Miyu Sawai
 Erika Sawajiri
 Riho Sayashi
 Subaru Shibutani
 Daiki Shigeoka
 Pikarin Shiina
 Rumi Shishido
 Yumi Sugimoto
 Airi Suzuki
 Kanon Suzuki
 Ranran Suzuki

T 
 Tackey & Tsubasa (duo)
 Tacoyaki Rainbow (group)
 Taiyō to Ciscomoon (group)
 Tanpopo (group)
 Team Shachi (group)
 Team Syachihoko (group)
 Tegomass (duo)
 The Checkers (group)
 The Hoopers (group)
 The Peanuts (duo)
 TOKIO (group)
 Tokyo Girls' Style (group)
 Tokyo Performance Doll (group)
 Toraji Haiji (duo)
 Travis Japan (group)
 Triangle (group)
 TrySail (group)
 Tsuri Bit (group)
 TVXQ (duo)
 Twinklestars (group)
 Kana Tachibana
 Junnosuke Taguchi
 Mizue Takada
 Reni Takagi
 Ayahi Takagaki
 Ai Takahashi
 Yuya Takaki
 Shiori Tamai
 Yukari Tamura
 Koki Tanaka
 Reina Tanaka
 Yuya Tegoshi
 Takuya Terada
 Erika Toda
 Haruka Tomatsu
 Aki Toyosaki
 Kana Tsugihara
 Momoko Tsugunaga

U 
 Up Up Girls (Kakko Kari) (group)
 Yuki Uchida
 Tatsuya Ueda
 Aya Ueto
 Takako Uehara
 Uijin (group)
 Kan Usuki

V 
 V6 (group)
 v-u-den (group)
 Vanilla Beans (duo)
 Vanilla Mood (group)

W 
 W (duo)
 Wake Up, Girls!
 WaT (duo)
 Watarirouka Hashiritai 7 (group)
 w-inds (group)
 Wink (duo)
 Weather Girls (group)
 Whiteberry (group)
 Mayu Watanabe
 The World Standard

X 
X21 (group)

Y 
 Ya-ya-yah (group)
 YuiKaori (duo)
 Yumemiru Adolescence (group)
 Kota Yabu
 Hiroko Yakushimaru
 Takayuki Yamada
 Ryosuke Yamada
 Momoe Yamaguchi
 Linda Yamamoto
 Tomohisa Yamashita
 Wakana Yamashita
 Hikaru Yaotome
 Shota Yasuda
 You Yokoyama
 Miho Yoshioka
 Yui Yoshioka
 Hitomi Yoshizawa

Z 
 Z-1 (group)
 Zone (group)
 ZYX (group)

Best selling
The following is a list of the 20 all-time best-selling Japanese idols in Japan as of 2011, according to the Japanese music television program Music Station.

See also
List of Japanese gravure idols
List of Japanese celebrities
List of Japanese comedians

References

Japanese idols
Idols